MOESK (Moscow United Electric Grid Company; former name: Moscow Region Power Grid Company) is an electric power transmission and distribution company operating in the Moscow metropolitan area, Russia. It also provides connection services and installation, repair, and technical maintenance services for electrical equipment.

The company was established as a result of the reorganization of Mosenergo on 1 April 2005. Its original name was  the Moscow Region Power Grid Company. The company changed its name to Moscow United Electric Grid Company in June 2006. The company is based in Moscow, the Russian Federation.It is a subsidiary of Holding IDGC.

The company attendance territory equals  with the population of around 17 million people.

References 

Companies listed on the Moscow Exchange
Electric power transmission system operators in Russia
Companies based in Moscow